Guilherme Mauricio (born 12 October 1974) is a French former professional footballer who played as a midfielder.

External links
 
 

1974 births
Living people
Sportspeople from Clichy, Hauts-de-Seine
Association football midfielders
French footballers
Red Star F.C. players
Stade Lavallois players
LB Châteauroux players
La Vitréenne FC players
Ligue 2 players
Footballers from Hauts-de-Seine